Chamaesphecia schmidtiiformis is a moth of the family Sesiidae. It is found in Italy, the Balkan Peninsula and Ukraine. It is also found from Turkey to the Black Sea coast, the Caucasus, Turkmenistan and Iran.

The wingspan is 17–26 mm.

The larvae feed on Salvia verticillata, Salvia sclarea and Salvia syriaca.

References

Moths described in 1836
Sesiidae
Moths of Europe
Moths of Asia